David George Roniel Eames (born 15 April 1937) is an English former first-class cricketer.

Born at London Colney, Ellis made one appearance in first-class cricket for the Marylebone Cricket Club (MCC) against Oxford University at Lord's in 1958. Batting twice in the match, he was dismissed for 14 runs by Andrew Corran in the MCC first-innings, while in their second-innings he was dismissed by Ian Gibson for 7 runs. He also bowled four wicket-less overs.

References

External links

1937 births
Living people
People from St Albans (district)
English cricketers
Marylebone Cricket Club cricketers